The golden spider beetle, Niptus hololeucus, is a species of spider beetle in the family Ptinidae.

Description
Niptus hololeucus is 3–4.5mm in length. Its body is covered in silky golden hairs and fine scales.

Habitat
Niptus hololeucus may be a pest of a wide variety of cereal based food products.
In 1981 an account of an infestation of these beetles was located in a roof void above offices in Rotherham, U.K. This was found to be due to wild pigeons which were nesting within the loft: the beetles and their larvae were feeding upon their waste matter.

Distribution
It is a temperate species originating in West Asia but now cosmopolitan. It is widespread across western Europe. A single record was first recorded in Iran in a cave 2014. N. hololeucus is one of the two species of Niptus to be found in caves.

Gallery

References

Household pest insects
Beetles described in 1836
Ptinidae